The 1977 Holy Cross Crusaders football team was an American football team that represented the College of the Holy Cross as an independent during the 1977 NCAA Division I football season. Head coach Neil Wheelwright returned for his second year. The team compiled a record of 5–6.

All home games were played at Fitton Field on the Holy Cross campus in Worcester, Massachusetts.

Schedule

Statistical leaders
Statistical leaders for the 1977 Crusaders included: 
 Rushing: Crocky Nangle, 603 yards and 4 touchdowns on 148 attempts
 Passing: Peter Colombo, 508 yards, 38 completions and 2 touchdowns on 77 attempts
 Receiving: Pat Kelly, 357 yards on 26 receptions
 Scoring: Crocky Nangle, 26 points from 4 touchdowns and 1 two-point conversion
 Total offense: Peter Colombo, 610 yards (508 passing, 102 rushing)
 All-purpose yards: Larry Ewald, 923 yards (435 returning, 408 rushing, 80 receiving)
 Interceptions: Herb Mihalik, 6 interceptions for 24 yards

References

Holy Cross
Holy Cross Crusaders football seasons
Holy Cross Crusaders football